Shahe railway station is a railway station in Beijing. Passenger services ceased on 15 September 2012.

It is a station on the Beijing–Zhangjiakou intercity railway, currently no trains stop at this station.

See also 

 Shahe station
 List of stations on Jingbao railway

References 

Stations on the Beijing–Baotou Railway
Stations on the Beijing–Zhangjiakou Intercity Railway
Railway stations in Beijing
Railway stations in China opened in 1905